The 2003 Cincinnati Bengals season was the franchise's 34th season in the National Football League (NFL), the 36th overall, and the first under head coach Marvin Lewis, who replaced Dick LeBeau, who was fired following the 2002 season which the worst season in Bengals history. The Bengals had the first overall pick in the 2003 NFL Draft with which they selected 2002 Heisman Trophy winner Carson Palmer. After a slow start, the Bengals got hot winning at midseason, winning four straight games to stand at 7–5, entering a key Week 14 matchup with the Baltimore Ravens with a chance to win the division. However, in the key showdown for first place the Bengals showed they were not quite ready for primetime as they were beaten 31–13. The Bengals would rebound to win their next game against the San Francisco 49ers, but at 8–6 the Bengals could not get that ninth win, losing their last two games to spoil an effort to earn their first winning season since 1990, finishing at 8–8.

Along with Willie Anderson, Chad Johnson, for the first time in his career, was named to the Pro Bowl at the end of the season.

Offseason 
The Bengals lost fullback Lorenzo Neal and linebacker Takeo Spikes in free agency, while signing cornerback Tory James, safety Rogers Beckett, linebacker Kevin Hardy, defensive tackle John Thornton, tight end Reggie Kelly, quarterback Shane Matthews and defensive ends Duane Clemons and Carl Powell.

NFL Draft

Personnel

Roster

Regular season

Schedule 

Note: Intra-divisional opponents are in bold text

Standings

Team leaders

Passing

Rushing

Receiving

Defensive

Kicking and punting

Special teams

Awards 
 Jon Kitna QB, NFL Comeback Player of the Year

Milestones
 Chad Johnson 2nd 1000 yard receiving season (1,355 yards)
 Brandon Bennett 2nd 1000-yard return season (1,146 yards)

References

External links 
 
 2003 Cincinnati Bengals at Pro-Football-Reference.com

Cincinnati Bengals
Cincinnati Bengals seasons
Cincin